Paul Olsson (born 24 December 1965) is an English former footballer who scored 28 goals from 338 appearances in the Football League playing for Exeter City, Scarborough, Hartlepool United and Darlington in the 1980s and 1990s. A midfielder, he began his football career with home-town club Hull City without appearing for them in the league, and also played non-league football for North Ferriby United.

He was manager of Scarborough Athletic in the 2010–11 season.

References

External links
 

1965 births
Living people
Footballers from Kingston upon Hull
English footballers
Association football midfielders
Hull City A.F.C. players
Exeter City F.C. players
Scarborough F.C. players
Hartlepool United F.C. players
Darlington F.C. players
North Ferriby United A.F.C. players
English Football League players
English football managers